Bruno Jonas (born in Passau, Germany, on 3 December 1952) is a German Kabarett artist and actor.

Education
Many people predicted he would become a priest, but he prefers to pray from the Kabarett stage. Between 1975 and 1982, he studied German, political science, and philosophy at the Ludwig Maximilian University of Munich. After several years he began to study theatre.

Career
In 1975, Jonas played with Sigi Zimmerschied in the Kabarett Scharfrichterhaus. After an engagement as a writer and actor at the national theater in Munich he started his first soloprogram in 1979. He reached Germany through his first own radio show Jonas and regular appearances with Dieter Hildebrandt as member of the Kabarett theatre Münchner Lach- und Schießgesellschaft and later until today in the political Kabarett TV series Scheibenwischer (together with Mathias Richling). He also appeared as monk Bruder Barnabas at "Starkbieranstich" on the "Nockherberg" in Munich, a traditional ceremony usually in March, in which Bruder Barnabas is giving a ticking-off to the present high-ranked politicians. In 2004 he started to work as a director at Theater am Gärtnerplatz where he also directed the Musical Man of La Mancha and played the part of Don Quichotte.

Publications
1987 – Der Morgen davor
1990 – Wirklich wahr
1993 – Wirklich wahr (CD)
1995 – Hin und zurück
1996 – Es soll nie wieder vorkommen
1996 – Red ned (CD)
1998 – Ich alter Ego (CD)
1998 – Ich alter Ego
2000 – Bin ich noch zu retten?
2002 – Gebrauchsanweisung für Bayern

References

External links 
 Bruno Jonas
 Literature over and by Bruno Jonas in German National Library
 Bruno Jonas in Internet Movie Database

1952 births
Living people
German radio personalities
German television personalities
German cabaret performers
Kabarettists
People from Passau
ARD (broadcaster) people